Orange County is located in the central portion of the U.S. state of Florida. As of the 2020 census, the population was 1,429,908, making it Florida's fifth most populous county. The county seat is Orlando. Orange County is the central county of the Orlando-Kissimmee-Sanford, Florida Metropolitan Statistical Area.

History

The land that is Orange County was part of the first land to come up from below the Early Oligocene sea 33.9–28.4 million years ago and is known as Orange Island. Orange County's Rock Spring location is a Pleistocene fossil-bearing area and has yielded a vast variety of birds and mammals including giant sloth, mammoth, camel, and the dire wolf dating around 1.1 million years ago.

19th century to mid-20th century
Immediately following the transfer of Florida to the United States in 1821, Governor Andrew Jackson created two counties: Escambia to the west of the Suwannee River and St. Johns to the east. In 1824, the area to the south of St. Johns County was organized as Mosquito County, and Enterprise was named its county seat. This large county took up much of central Florida. It was renamed as Orange County in 1845 when Florida became a state. After population increased in the region, the legislature organized several counties, such as Osceola (1887), Seminole (1913), Lake  (1887), and Volusia (1854), from its territory.

During the post-Reconstruction period, white people committed a high rate of racial violence against black people in Orange County; they exercised terrorism to re-establish and maintain white supremacy. Whites lynched 33 African Americans here from 1877 to 1950; most were killed in the decades around the turn of the 20th century. This was the highest total of any county in the state, and sixth highest of any county in the country. Florida had the highest per-capita rate of lynchings of any state in the South, where the great majority of these extrajudicial murders took place.

Among the terrorist lynchings was the death of Julius "July" Perry of Ocoee, whose body was found November 3, 1920, hanged from a lightpole in Orlando, near the house of a judge known to be sympathetic to black voting. But this was part of a much larger story of KKK and other white attempts to suppress black voting in Ocoee and the state. African Americans had organized for a year to increase voter turnout for the 1920 presidential election, with organizations helping prepare residents for voter registration, paying for poll taxes, and similar actions. On Election Day in Ocoee, blacks were turned away from the polls. Perry, a prosperous farmer, was suspected of sheltering Mose Norman, an African-American man who had tried to vote. After Norman was twice turned away, white violence broke out, resulting in a riot through the black community, leaving an estimated 50 to 60 African-Americans dead and all the properties destroyed. Many blacks fled from Ocoee to save their lives, and the town became all-white. Voting efforts were suppressed for decades.

Later 20th century to present
Orange County was named for the fruit that constituted the county's main commodity crop. The dark-green foliage of orange trees filled the county, as did the scent of the orange blossoms when in bloom. Fewer commercial orange groves remained by the end of the twentieth century. The majority of groves were destroyed by the freezing temperatures that occurred in December 1983, January 1985, and December 1989, the worst since 1899.

The financial setbacks, not the first in the grove region's history, were too challenging for many growers. Economically destroyed, many walked away from the land. Others awaited other opportunities. One of the region's major land owners and growers was the Tropicana company. They withdrew rather than try to come back from these seemingly endless generational decimation. With no realistic avenues for agricultural use of this rural land, and Florida's continuing strong population growth and its attendant needs (aided and supported by the success of nearby Walt Disney World and Universal Studios Florida), these areas began to be developed for housing. However, several packing facilities and wholesalers still remain in Orange County.

Geography

Adjacent counties
 Seminole County - north
 Volusia County - northeast
 Brevard County - east
 Osceola County - south
 Polk County - southwest
 Lake County - west

Transportation

Airports
 Orlando Apopka Airport, a privately owned uncontrolled, public-use airport in the City of Apopka which serves small private aircraft, there is no commercial service.
 Orlando Executive Airport, a public airport owned by GOAA which serves private jets and small aircraft. It is a reliever airport for Orlando International Airport.
 Orlando International Airport, the busiest airport in Florida by passenger traffic, is a public international airport owned by GOAA serving both commercial and private aircraft.

Major highways

Public transportation
 Amtrak a nationwide rail service with two stations in Orange County, Orlando and Winter Park
 Brightline a high-speed rail line which will operate service from Orlando International Airport to West Palm Beach, Fort Lauderdale and Miami starting in 2023.
 Greyhound a U.S. Intercity common carrier bus company providing nationwide service from Orlando.
 Lynx a public bus authority providing service in Orange County and five additional Central Florida counties including Lake, Osceola, Polk, Seminole and Volusia.
 SunRail a commuter rail service with eight stations serving Orange County and eight additional stations in three adjacent counties (Osceola, Volusia and Seminole).

Demographics

As of the 2020 United States census, there were 1,429,908 people, 468,075 households, and 309,344 families residing in the county.

Census
The 2010 U.S. Census reported the following ethnic and racial statistics:
 63.6% of the population was White (46.0% Non-Hispanic White): (10.0% German, 8.5% Irish, 7.4% English, 5.6% Italian, 2.1% French, 1.8% Polish, 1.5% Scottish, 1.3% Scotch-Irish, 1.0% Dutch, 0.8% Swedish, 0.7% Russian, 0.6% Norwegian, 0.5% Welsh, 0.5% French Canadian)
 20.8% of residents were Black (19.5% Non-Hispanic Black) (5.4% West Indian/Afro-Caribbean American [2.6% Haitian, 1.5% Jamaican, 0.4% Other and Unspecified West Indian, 0.3% Trinidadian and Tobagonian, 0.1% British West Indian, 0.1% U.S. Virgin Islander, 0.1% Bahamian,] 0.7% Subsaharan African)
 26.9% of residents were Hispanic or Latino of any race (13.0% Puerto Rican, 3.2% Mexican, 2.0% Colombian, 2.0% Cuban, 1.8% Dominican, 0.7% Venezuelan, 0.5% Ecuadoran, 0.5% Peruvian)
 4.9% of residents were Asian (1.4% Indian, 0.9% Vietnamese, 0.8% Filipino, 0.7% Chinese, 0.6% Other Asian, 0.3% Korean, 0.2% Japanese)
 Two or more races: 3.4%
 American Indian and Alaska Native: 0.4%
 Native Hawaiian and Other Pacific Islander: 0.1%
 Other Races: 6.7% (0.8% Arab)

In 2010, 5.9% of the population considered themselves to be of only "American" ancestry (regardless of race or ethnicity.)

There were 421,847 households, out of which 30.81% had children under the age of 18 living with them, 43.50% were married couples living together, 15.65% had a female householder with no husband present, and 35.18% were non-families. 24.85% of all households were made up of individuals, and 6.08% (1.71% male and 4.37% female) had someone living alone who was 65 years of age or older. The average household size was 2.64 and the average family size was 3.19.

In the county, the population was spread out, with 23.6% under the age of 18, 12.8% from 18 to 24, 29.8% from 25 to 44, 24.1% from 45 to 64, and 9.7% who were 65 years of age or older. The median age was 33.7 years. For every 100 females, there were 97.0 males. For every 100 females age 18 and over, there were 94.9 males.

The median income for a household in the county was $50,138, and the median income for a family was $57,473. Males had a median income of $40,619 versus $31,919 for females. The per capita income for the county was $25,490. About 10.0% of families and 13.4% of the population were below the poverty line, including 17.2% of those under age 18 and 9.4% of those aged 65 or over.

In 2010, 19.1% of the county's population was foreign born, with 43.8% being naturalized American citizens. Of foreign-born residents, 68.9% were born in Latin America, 17.8% born in Asia, 8.1% were born in Europe, 3.0% born in Africa, 2.0% in North America, and 0.2% were born in Oceania.

Languages
As of 2010, 67.43% of all residents spoke only English at home, while 22.59% spoke Spanish, 2.44% French Creole (mostly Haitian Creole), 1.23% Portuguese, 0.88% Vietnamese, 0.78% Indian languages (including Gujarati and Hindi), 0.58% Tagalog, 0.53% Chinese, 0.50% French, and 0.45% Arabic. In total, 32.57% of the population spoke languages other than English at home.

Government
The county functions under a charter form of government. The charter serves as a constitution, detailing the structure and operation of the local government. A Charter Review Commission has the power to consider and place amendments on the ballot. Voters then decide whether to accept or reject all amendments put forth. If voters approve an amendment, it is then inserted into the charter.

Federal representation
Four districts of the U.S. House of Representatives represent parts of Orange County.

District 7 encompasses all of Seminole County and portions of northern Orange County

Places include: Sanford, Lake Mary, Altamonte Springs, Maitland, Winter Park and parts of Orlando

District 8 encompasses all of Brevard and Indian River Counties and far eastern Orange County

District 9 encompasses all of Osceola County, eastern Polk County and eastern and south central Orange County

Places include: Kissimmee, Winter Haven and most of Orlando

District 10 encompasses western Orange County

Places include: Eatonville, Apopka, Ocoee, Winter Garden, Windermere and part of western Orlando

State representation
Orange County residents are represented in Tallahassee with 3 Senate seats.

District 11 encompasses northwestern Orange County

District 13 encompasses north central and northeastern Orange County

District 15 encompasses all of Osceola County and the southern third of Orange County

Orange County residents are represented in Tallahassee with 9 House seats.

District 30 encompasses southern Seminole and portions of northern Orange County

District 31 encompasses northern Lake County and northwest Orange County

District 44, 45, 46, 47, 48, and 49 are wholly composed of Orange.

District 50 encompasses northern Brevard County and eastern Orange County

County representation
Orange County is served by a board of commissioners. The board consists of an elected mayor and six commissioners. The mayor is elected At-large, while commissioners are elected from single-member districts. The mayor and commissioners each serve staggered four-year terms. Commissioners from Districts 1, 3, and 5 are elected in presidential election years, while the mayor and commissioners from Districts 2, 4, and 6 are elected in alternate years. The county is also served by a clerk of courts, sheriff, property appraiser, tax collector, supervisor of elections, state attorney, and public defender. All positions are four-year terms, requiring direct election by voters in presidential election years.

Voter Registration

Education

Public education
The Orange County Public Schools deliver public education to students countywide. Its functions and expenditures are overseen by an elected school board composed of a chairman, elected at-large; and seven members, elected from single-member districts. Each member is elected to a four-year term: the chairman and three other members are elected in gubernatorial election years, while the other four are elected in presidential election years. As of the 2021–2022 school year, the school system operated 205 schools (127 elementary, 9 K-8, 39 middle, 22 high, and 8 exceptional learning), with 206,246 students. It is the fourth-largest school district statewide and ninth in the nation.

Colleges and universities
The University of Central Florida is the sole 4-year public university. As of the Fall 2020 semester, a total of 71,948 students attended the university, making it the largest university in the nation by enrollment. The university's 1,415 acre main campus is situated in northeast Orange County.

Nearby Winter Park is home to Rollins College, a private college situated only a few miles from Downtown Orlando. In 2012, it was ranked #1 by U.S. News & World Report amongst regional universities in the South.

With six campuses spread throughout the county, Valencia College offers two-year degree programs, as well three baccalaureate programs.

The law schools for Barry University and Florida A&M are also conveniently located in Downtown Orlando.

Full Sail University is a for-profit university in Winter Park, Florida. Full Sail is not regionally accredited, but is nationally accredited by the Accrediting Commission of Career Schools and Colleges (ACCSC) to award associate's, bachelor's degrees, and master's degrees in audio, film, design, computer animation, business, and other fields.[10] The school offers 35 degree programs and 2 graduate certificates and has a student population of more than 16,800.

Films
Walt Before Mickey, a feature film about Walt Disney creating Mickey Mouse, was shot locally.

Libraries
Orange County is served by the Orange County Library System, which was established in 1923. Before the opening of the Albertson Public Library in 1923, a circulating library maintained by the Sorosis Club of Orlando offered book lending services to patrons on a subscription basis. The Albertson Public Library was established with the collection of Captain Charles L. Albertson and the library was named in his honor. In 1924, the Booker T. Washington Branch of the Albertson Library was established to service the African American community of Orlando. In 1966, the current Orlando Public Library building was completed on the grounds of the Albertson Public Library. Currently there are 16 libraries within the Orange County Library system. The library systems offers a diverse selection of materials, free programs and free access to various databases. In addition, the library offers free delivery of most items through its MAYL service.

One exception exists in the cities of Maitland and Winter Park which are each part of a separate library taxing districts and as a result residents of these cities are not entitled to receive resident borrowing privileges at OCLS branches even though they are technically and legally residents of Orange County, instead an agreement was reached between Maitland, Winter Park and the OCLS whereas a resident of those cities can go to any OCLS branch and request a "Reciprocal borrower card" which is provided free of charge. The Reciprocal borrower cards is valid for one year and can be used at any OCLS branch with the exception of the Melrose Center at the Orlando Public Library which requires a separate Melrose Center specific card which is issued after the user applies for the card and goes through a mandatory orientation class. Access to the OCLS Internet on library owned PCs requires a Reciprocal borrower to pay small session access fee. The OCLS Wi-Fi network which is available at all branches remains free of charge to all users including Reciprocal borrowers and visitors who use their own iPad, Mac, PC, Smartphone or tablet devices. Maitland and Winter Park Library do not provide reciprocal privileges to OCLS patrons and charge non-residents a yearly user fee.

Politics
Orange County is located along the pivotal Interstate 4 corridor, a powerful swing region in one of the country's most critical swing states. Many close elections are won or lost depending on the voting outcome along the corridor. Voters are considered independent, traditionally splitting their votes, electing Democrats and Republicans on the same ballot. As a result of such independence, voters are inundated with non-stop television and radio ads months preceding a general election.

Orange County was one of the first areas of Florida to turn Republican. It swung from a 15-point victory for Franklin D. Roosevelt in 1944 to a seven-point victory for Thomas E. Dewey in 1948. It eventually became one of the stronger Republican bastions in Florida, as evidenced when it gave Barry Goldwater 56 percent of its vote in 1964. For most of the second half of the 20th century, it was one of the more conservative urban counties in Florida and the nation. From 1948 to 1988, Democrats only cracked the 40 percent barrier twice, in 1964 and 1976. However, the Republican edge narrowed considerably in the 1990s. George H. W. Bush fell from 67 percent of the vote in 1988 to only 45.9 percent in 1992. In 1996, Bob Dole only won the county by 520 votes.

In September 2000, Democrats overtook Republicans in voter registration. This was a factor in Al Gore becoming the first Democratic presidential candidate to carry the county since 1944. John Kerry narrowly carried the county in 2004. In 2008, however, Orange County swung hard to Barack Obama, who won it by the largest margin for a Democrat since Roosevelt. In the years since, it has become one of the strongest Democratic bastions in Florida.

Since 2000, Republicans have yet to retake the advantage they once enjoyed. In the twelve years that followed, Democrats experienced a modest increase in their voter registration percentage from 41.40% to 42.73% of the electorate. Minor party voters also had modest growth, increasing from 2.17% to 2.37%. In contrast, Republicans experienced a sharp decrease in registered voters, sliding from 40.95% in 2000 down to 29.85% in 2012. The beneficiary of the Republican losses have been unaffiliated voters. The percentage of the electorate identifying as an unaffiliated voter increased from 15.47% to 25.06% during this same period. Orange County is one of two different counties in the entire nation to have voted for Al Gore in 2000 after voting for Dole in 1996, a distinction it shares with Charles County, Maryland.

Voter registration

Communities

Cities

 Apopka
 Bay Lake
 Belle Isle
 Edgewood
 Lake Buena Vista
 Maitland
 Ocoee
 Orlando
 Winter Garden
 Winter Park

Towns
 Eatonville
 Oakland
 Windermere

Census-designated places

 Alafaya
 Azalea Park
 Bay Hill
 Bithlo
 Christmas
 Clarcona
 Conway
 Dr. Phillips
 Fairview Shores
 Four Corners
 Goldenrod
 Gotha
 Holden Heights
 Horizon West
 Hunter's Creek
 Lake Butler
 Lake Hart
 Lake Mary Jane
 Lockhart
 Meadow Woods
 Oak Ridge
 Orlo Vista
 Paradise Heights
 Pine Castle
 Pine Hills
 Rio Pinar
 Sky Lake
 South Apopka
 Southchase
 Taft
 Tangelo Park
 Tangerine
 Tildenville
 Union Park
 University
 Wedgefield
 Williamsburg
 Zellwood

Other unincorporated communities
 Andover Lakes
 Chinatown
 Fairvilla
 Killarney
 Plymouth
 Reedy Creek Improvement District
 Vineland

See also
 Innovation Way
 List of amusement parks in Central Florida
 List of tallest buildings in Orlando
 Mayor of Orange County
 National Register of Historic Places listings in Orange County, Florida
 Board of County Commissioners
 Orange County Health Department
 Teresa Jacobs

Notes

References

External links
 Photographs From the State Archives of Florida.
 Central Florida Memory is a unique digital collection where visitors can discover the history of Orange County and surrounding areas of Central Florida.
 Orange County Regional History Center
 The West Orange Times newspaper that serves Orange County, Florida available in full-text with images in Florida Digital Newspaper Library
 Orange County Health Department 
 Orange County Collection on RICHES Mosaic Interface 

 
Charter counties in Florida
Counties in Greater Orlando
1845 establishments in Florida
Populated places established in 1845